The Blood-Splat Rating System is the debut studio album of American rock band Powerman 5000. Released in 1995, it is the band's second independent release. The album was a local success in Boston, MA, sold out of its initial pressing and won three awards from the 1995 Boston Phoenix Readers' Poll, including "Best Metal Album", "Best Rap Album" and "Album of the Year". Its success led to a contract with the major label DreamWorks Records, who reissued the album under the title Mega!! Kung Fu Radio on February 25, 1997. It had sold 156,954 copies by 2003.

Style 
The album's musical style incorporates elements of heavy metal, funk and hard rock. According to AllMusic's Chris Slawecki, vocalist Spider One "doesn't sing one single lyric, instead barking out the lyrics in a hard staccato delivery."

Track listing 
(The Blood-Splat Rating System, 1995)
"Public Menace, Freak, Human Fly" – 3:38
 "Neckbone" – 4:00
 "Car Crash"  – 2:42
 "Earth vs. Me" – 3:20
 "A Swim with the Sharks" – 3:28
 "Tokyo Vigilante #1" – 3:00
 "Organizized" – 3:56
 "Boredwitcha" – 2:50
 "Standing 8" – 3:44
 "Even Superman Shot Himself" – 5:47
 "File Under Action" (hidden track after track 10) – 4:19

(Mega!! Kung Fu Radio, 1997)
 "Public Menace, Freak, Human Fly" – 3:38
 "Organizized" – 3:55
 "Neckbone" – 4:00
 "Car Crash"  – 2:42
 "Earth vs. Me" – 3:20
 "A Swim with the Sharks" – 3:20
 "20 Miles to Texas 25 to Hell" – 3:16
 "Mega!! Kung Fu Radio" – 3:38
 "Tokyo Vigilante #1" – 2:59
 "Boredwitcha" – 2:50
 "Standing 8" – 3:35
 "Even Superman Shot Himself" – 5:47
 "File Under Action" (hidden track after track 12) – 4:19

Credits

Powerman 5000
 Spider – vocals
 Adam 12 – guitar
 Dorian – bass
 Jordan – percussion
 Al – drums

Other personnel
 Mudrock – producer, mixing
 Chris Shaw – mixing
 Frank E. Butkus – mixing
 Tom Baker – mastering
 Wendy Sherman – art direction, design
 John Diaz – art direction, design
Ron Handler- A&R

References 

Powerman 5000 albums
1995 albums
DreamWorks Records albums